Wasabi Anime (also known as Green Mustard Entertainment) is a company that produces events and programming for anime conventions (and other fan conventions) in North America along with their own stand alone conventions.  Started in 2001 (with the registration of the WasabiAnime.com website) the group started as an anime club before evolving into an LLC in 2007 and then a corporation in 2010.  As of July 2012, Wasabi Anime has hosted events in California, Florida, Georgia, Indiana, and Las Vegas.

History
Wasabi Anime was started by Tom Croom with a group of motivated anime fans shortly after the completion of Anime Festival Orlando II in Kissimmee, Florida.  The group felt that dedicating help to one single convention and club didn't serve the purpose of helping all of fandom, so Wasabi Anime (then called "Wasabi Anime of Florida") began networking pre-existing anime clubs and helping support new anime clubs.  Wasabi Anime club members had access to photo I.D. cards that granted discounts a local anime and comic stores in Florida.  Clubs in the Wasabi Anime network included:
 Anime Goes Anime Club Miami
 Gator Anime
 HIYAH! The Southwest Florida Anime Club
 Japanese Animation Club of Tallahassee
 Lake Brantley High School Anime & SciFi Club
 Mile Stretch Anime Club
 North Port Anime Club
 Oukyuu Anime Club
 Wasabi Anime: Deltona
 Wasabi Anime: Englewood
 Wasabi Anime: Ft. Lauderdale
 Wasabi Anime: Green Cove Springs (went on to become the Anime Belle club)
 Wasabi Anime: Jacksonville
 Wasabi Anime: Miami
 Wasabi Anime: New Smyrna Beach
 Wasabi Anime: Orlando
 Wasabi Anime: Tampa (went on to be the original volunteer staff for MetroCon 2003)
 Wasabi Anime: Titusville
 Wasabi Anime: Treasure Coast
 Wasabi Anime: West Palm Beach

Occasionally, the core group running Wasabi Anime would host stand alone events to try and gather the clubs together.  This included the Wasabi Anime Halloween Cosplay Parties in 2001 and 2003.

Around 2004, Wasabi Anime began to step away from networking clubs and started focusing more on designing events for anime and fan conventions.  These included themed panels, game shows, dances, and stage shows (like the Wasabi Animusical.)

Appearances
Wasabi Anime has designed entertainment and programming for a number of anime and fan conventions since starting in 2001.

California
 Anime Expo 2012

Florida
 AccioCon (2009)
 Ancient City Con 4 (2010)
 Animation Supercon 2009
 Anime Express V (2002)
 Anime Express VI (2003)
 Anime Festival Orlando III (2002)
 Anime Festival Orlando IV (2003)
 Anime Festival Orlando V (2004)
 Anime Festival Orlando VI (2005)
 Anime Festival Orlando VII (2006)
 Anime Festival Orlando VIII (2007)
 Anime Festival Orlando IX (2008)
 Anime Festival Orlando X (2009)
 Anime Festival Orlando XI (2010)
 Anime Festival Orlando XIII (2012)
 Broward Anime Festival (2009)
 DreamCon (2004)
 FITCON 2003
 FITCON 2004
 FITCON 2008
 Florida Supercon 2009
 Florida Supercon 2010
 Florida Supercon 2011
 FX Show 2005
 FX Show 2006
 FX Show 2007
 FX Show 2008
 FX Show 2009
 JACON 2002
 JACON 2003
 JACON 2004
 JACON 2005
 JACON 2006
 JACON 2007
 JACON 2008
 MetroCon 2003
 MetroCon 2004
 The Nightmare Before Thanksgiving (2004)
 Umicon 2012
 Vulkon Orlando 2003
 Vulkon Tampa 2003
 YasumiCon 2003
 YasumiCon 2005

Georgia
 Anime Weekend Atlanta 15 (2009)
 Anime Weekend Atlanta 16 (2010)
 Anime Weekend Atlanta 17 (2011)
 Dragon*Con 2007
 Dragon*Con 2011
 MomoCon 2011

Indiana
 Gen Con 2010
 Gen Con 2011
 Gen Con 2012

Nevada
 NeonCon 2010

Conventions
In 2007, Wasabi Anime began producing their own fan conventions.  Since some of these productions were not anime-centric, they often operated under the corporate names (either Green Mustard, LLC or Green Mustard Entertainment, Inc.)

References

Anime conventions in the United States
Companies based in Florida
Entertainment companies of the United States